Tang-e Sukhteh-ye Lirab (also Romanized as Tang-e Sūkhteh-ye Līrāb; also known as Tang-e Sūkhteh and Tong Sūkhteh) is a village in Bahmayi-ye Sarhadi-ye Sharqi Rural District, Dishmok District, Kohgiluyeh County, Kohgiluyeh and Boyer-Ahmad Province, Iran. At the 2006 census, its population was 118, in 20 families.

References 

Populated places in Kohgiluyeh County